The Most Reverend James Lynch, C.M. (1807–1896) was an Irish clergyman who held a number of high offices in the Roman Catholic Church in Scotland and Ireland.

He was born on 23 January 1807 in Dublin, Ireland. He was ordained a priest in the Congregation of the Mission on 18 June 1833. He was appointed Coadjutor Vicar Apostolic of Western District in Scotland and Titular Bishop of Arcadiopolis in Asia on 31 August 1866. He was consecrated on 13 April 1866. His principal consecrator was Bishop William Keane of Cloyne, and his principal co-consecrators were Bishop Laurence Gillooly of Elpin and Bishop Michael O'Hea of Ross. Three years later, Lynch was appointed Coadjutor Bishop of the Diocese of Kildare and Leighlin on 13 April 1869. He succeeded Diocesan Bishop of Kildare and Leighlin on 5 March 1888. He died in office on 19 December 1896, aged 89 years old.

References

Roman Catholic bishops of Kildare and Leighlin
Christian clergy from Dublin (city)
1807 births
1896 deaths
Irish Vincentians